Staircasing may refer to:

 Increasing one's share of a home in equity sharing
 "Jaggies" — jagged lines in computer graphics

See also
 Staircase (disambiguation)